Dullāh Bhādera is a village and Union Council of Bahawalnagar District in the Punjab province of Pakistan. It is part of Chishtian Tehsil. It was built by and named after Abdullah Khan Bhadera three centuries ago. It is a few kilometers from the bank of river Sutlej. The village has a hospital (Basic Health Unit) and a middle school each for boys and girls.

References

Populated places in Bahawalnagar District